David Law is an American Republican politician who represented Michigan's 39th district in the Michigan House of Representatives from 2005 to 2008.

Tenure
Law Served on the Judiciary , Commerce , Insurance , Transportation, and Government Operations committee

Electoral history

References

21st-century American politicians
Republican Party members of the Michigan House of Representatives
Living people
Year of birth missing (living people)